The Royal Logistic Corps provides logistic support functions to the British Army. It is the largest Corps in the Army.

History

The Royal Logistic Corps (RLC) was formed on 5 April 1993, by the union of five British Army corps:

 Royal Engineers Postal and Courier Service
 Royal Corps of Transport
 Royal Army Ordnance Corps
 Royal Pioneer Corps
 Army Catering Corps

The RLC comprises both Regular and Army Reserve units.

The RLC is the only combat service support corps of the British Army with battle honours, derived from the usage of previous transport elements of the Royal Waggon Train, and their successors as cavalry. The battle honours are:

 Peninsula
 Battle of Waterloo
 Lucknow
 Taku Forts
 Peking

Cap Badge
The RLC cap badge is an amalgamation of the cap badges of the forming corps:

 The laurel and garter band is from the Royal Engineers
 The Indian star is from the Royal Corps of Transport
 The shield in the centre is from the Royal Army Ordnance Corps
 The crossed axes are from the Royal Pioneer Corps
 The motto, "We Sustain", is from the Army Catering Corps

The inscription on the garter band "Honi soit qui mal y pense" can be translated as "Shame on anyone who thinks evil of it". It is the motto of the  Order of the Garter.

Headquarters
The Corps Headquarters is at Worthy Down Camp near Winchester. It is headed by a Colonel (Colonel RLC) as the professional head of the Corps. Col RLC is responsible for the Moral Component, regimental infrastructure and support and works to Commander Home Command.  Col RLC remains responsible for the Corps of Drums, which often parades with the RLC Band.
(AG).

The RLC Band was formed in 1993. It provides musical support while also representing the Royal Logistic Corps, and on occasion, the wider British Army. They are able to produce no more than 12 working ensembles at a time. These include a marching band, big band, fanfare team, and acoustic groups.

Museum
The Royal Logistic Corps Museum was based at Princess Royal Barracks, Deepcut near Camberley in Surrey, but was closed prior to a move to Worthy Down near Winchester, where it re-opened in May 2021.

List of units

Regiments

|  style="text-align:left; width:50%; vertical-align:top;"|
Regular regiments:
1 Regiment RLC
3 Regiment RLC
4 Regiment RLC
6 Regiment RLC
7 Regiment RLC
9 Regiment RLC
10 Queen's Own Gurkha Logistic Regiment RLC
11 Explosive Ordnance Disposal and Search Regiment RLC
13 Air Assault Support Regiment RLC
17 Port and Maritime Regiment RLC
25 Training Regiment RLC
27 Regiment RLC
29 Regiment RLC
ARRC Support Battalion  – (QOGLR personnel)

|  style="text-align:left; width:50%; vertical-align:top;"|

Reserve regiments:
150 (Yorkshire) Regiment RLC
151 (Greater London) Regiment RLC
152 (North Irish) Regiment RLC
154 (Scottish) Regiment RLC
156 (North West) Regiment RLC
157 (Welsh) Regiment RLC
158 (Royal Anglian) Regiment RLC
159 Regiment RLC
162 Regiment RLC
165 Port and Maritime Regiment RLC
167 Catering Support Regiment RLC

Specialist sub-units
Commando Logistic Support Squadron RLC – part of the Commando Logistic Regiment
383 Commando Petroleum Troop RLC
20 Transport Squadron RLC – part of London District
44 Support Squadron RLC – part of Royal Military Academy Sandhurst
105 Logistic Support Squadron – part of British Army Training Unit Suffield
132 Aviation Supply Squadron RLC – part of 7 Aviation Close Support Battalion REME
821 EOD & Search Squadron RLC – part of 33 Engineer Regiment (EOD)
Joint Helicopter Support Squadron – part of Joint Helicopter Command
2 Operational Support Group

Master General of Logistics
There is also a ceremonial head (instituted in 2009), who heads the Corps and its wider family such as the Associations and Cadets, known as the Master General of Logistics (MGL). Holders of the post include:

General Sir Kevin O'Donoghue (2009–2012)
Lieutenant General Sir Mark Poffley (2012–2021)
Major General Simon T. Hutchings (2021–present)

Publications
The Sustainer is the magazine of the RLC Association. The Waggoner remains the Journal of the RASC/RCT Association. The RAOC Gazette that of the RAOC Association and The Pioneer of the RPC Association. The Review is an annual magazine of essays published by the Corps.

Victoria Cross
The RLC has five Victoria Cross holders; Five derive historically from establishments that eventually became the Royal Corps of Transport.
Private Samuel Morley VC. Military Train. 15 April 1858.
Private (Farrier) Michael Murphy VC (forfeited). Military Train. 15 April 1858.
Assistant Commissary James Langley Dalton VC. Commissariat & Transport Department. 22 January 1879.
Second Lieutenant Alfred Cecil Herring VC. Army Service Corps. 23 March 1918.
Private Richard George Masters VC. Army Service Corps. 9 April 1918.

Order of precedence

See also

 Royal Logistic Corps Museum
 Royal Army Service Corps
 Options for Change
 Loss of Strength Gradient
 British logistics in the Boer War
 British logistics in the Falklands War
 Hong Kong Logistic Support Regiment RLC

References

Sources

External links

 The Royal Logistic Corps
 Royal Engineers Museum: Royal Engineers Transportation and Postal and Courier Services

 
British administrative corps
Military logistics of the United Kingdom
Military units and formations established in 1993
1993 establishments in the United Kingdom